A lucet is a tool used in cordmaking or braiding which is believed to date back to the Viking and Medieval periods, when it was used to create cords that were used on clothing, or to hang items from the belt. Lucet cord is square, strong, and slightly springy. It closely resembles knitted I-cord or the cord produced on a knitting spool. Lucet cord is formed by a series of loop like knots, and therefore will not unravel if cut.

Archaeological finds and a literary description of lucets strongly suggest that its use declined after the 12th century, but was revived in the 17th century. Its use waned again in the early 19th century.

A modern lucet fork is normally made of wood, with two prongs at one end and a handle on the other. It may also have a hole through which the cord can be pulled. Medieval lucets, in contrast, appear to be double-pronged, straight-sided implements, often made of bone. Some were shaped from hollowed bones, left tubular, presumably so that the cord could be drawn through the centre hole.

Construction of lucet braid

A number of techniques exist for the creation of lucet cord, all of which produce slightly different cords; it is possible to produce a two-coloured cord by using two strands of differently-coloured yarn. The only materials necessary to lucet are yarn and a lucet fork, also known as a chain fork or a lucet. Skewer-like sticks or knitting needles can be used to pull the yarn over as an additional tool. Lucets can be bought in shops as kits designed for children.

To cast on, the yarn is put through the hole in the lucet from the front, and the yarn in front of the lucet is wound around the prongs twice, in a figure-of-eight motion. The two lower loops are then lifted over the two upper loops, using either the fingers or a stick, until they are lifted over the 'horns' of the lucet fork, after which the thread behind the lucet is pulled to tighten the knot. The process is then repeated, this time (and every time after) winding the yarn just once around the prongs, as there is already a figure-of-eight of yarn on the fork.

When the desired length of lucet cord is reached, the lucet can be cast off by carefully lifting the loops off the prongs, passing the remaining thread through them, and pulling the knot tight. Any loose thread can be cut off with scissors, or tied together to form a closed circle. The cord can be wrapped around the lucet handle as it grows.

Lucet cord can be used for decorative edging, draw-strings, lacing, and any other use where a strong cord is needed.

See also
Spool knitting, more general, with two or more horns.

Notes

References

External links
 History of the lucet
 YouTube instructional video
 Lesson on how to lucet
 Lesson on how to double-lucet
 A page on knitting nancies, a descendant of the lucet
 The home of advanced lucetting

Braids
Decorative ropework